Geierhaupt (2,417 m) is a mountain of the Lower Tauern in Styria, Austria. It is the highest mountain of the Seckau Tauern sub group.

Pictures

References

Mountains of the Alps
Mountains of Styria